NTR  district is a district in coastal Andhra Region in the Indian state of Andhra Pradesh. The administrative headquarters is located at Vijayawada. The district is named after former Chief Minister of Andhra Pradesh N. T. Rama Rao.

History 
Named after former Chief Minister of Andhra Pradesh Nandamuri Taraka Rama Rao, NTR district was proposed on 26 January 2022 and became one of the twenty-six districts in the state after the gazette notification was issued by the Government of Andhra Pradesh on 3 April 2022. The gazette notification came into force on 4 April 2022. The district was carved out of Krishna district, and consists of the existing Vijayawada revenue division along with Nandigama and Tiruvuru revenue divisions, which were formed along with the district.

Geography 
NTR district is bordered with Krishna district and Eluru districts on the East, Palnadu district and Guntur districts on the South, Suryapet district of Telangana state on the West and Khammam district of Telangana state on the North.

The River Krishna flows towards East and acts as border between NTR and Palnadu district as well as Guntur districts.

Education 
Primary and secondary school education in the district is imparted by government, aided and private schools, under the School Education Department of the state.

NTR University of Health Sciences and School of Planning and Architecture, South Indian Chapter are located in Vijayawada. The district also has numerous engineering colleges, including Lakireddy Bali Reddy Engineering College, Loyola Engineering College and Potti Sri Ramulu College, and degree colleges including SRR & CVR Govt, Andhra Loyola College, P.B Siddarth, Maris Stella, K.B.N, KVR College in Nandigama, and SGS College in Jaggayyapeta, etc. Govt Polytechnic Vijayawada is one of the oldest polytechnic colleges in India.

Transportation

Road 

APSRTC state headquarters are located at Vijayawada.  APSRTC  operates bus services from Vijayawada to Machillipatnam, Eluru, Hanuman Junction, Gudivada, Avanigadda, Hyderabad, Kakinada, Narsapuram, Bhimavaram, Visakhapatnam, Srikakulam, Tirupati, Nandigama and Rajahmundry.

Railway 
The district is well connected to railways. Vijayawada is headquarters for Vijayawada railway division and Vijayawada Junction is one of the busiest railway stations in India.

Other railway stations in the district (all in Vijayawada) are:
Ramavarappadu
Kondapalli
Madhuranagar
Rayanapadu
Nidamanuru

Cities and towns 

Note -

** Vijayawada Population shown here is only, Municipal Corporation Population.

** Vijayawada Urban Agglomeration Population is 14,76,931

There are 8 towns in the district.Most populous    municipality is Vijayawada which has a population of 1.021 million consisting of 43% of the district's population.

Administrative divisions 

The district has three revenue divisions, namely Tiruvuru, Nandigama and Vijayawada, each headed by a sub collector or RDO. These revenue divisions are divided into 20 mandals. The district consists of one municipal corporation, Vijayawada.

Mandals 

There are 5 mandals in Tiruvuru division, 7 mandals in Nandigama and 8 in Vijayawada division. The 20 mandals under their revenue divisions are listed below:

Demographics 

At the time of the 2011 census, NTR district has a population of 22,18,591, of which 1,302,557 (58.71%) live in urban areas. NTR district has a sex ratio of 991 females per 1000 males. Scheduled Castes and Scheduled Tribes made up 4,06,350 (18.32%) and 82,101 (3.70%) of the population respectively.

At the time of the 2011 census, 90.12% of the population spoke Telugu, 6.90% Urdu and 1.43% Lambadi as their first language.

Tourism 

Kondapalli Fort, Bhavani Island, and temples like Kanaka Durga Temple, Sri Tirupatamma Gopayya Swamivarla Devasthanam, Vedadri Lakshmi Narasimha Swamy Devasthanam, Srikakulandhra Mahavishnu Devasthanam, Ghantasala Jaladheeswara Temple, Mopidevi Subhramanyeswara Swamy Temple are some of the major attractions.

Politics 

There are one parliamentary, Vijayawada (Lok Sabha constituency), and seven assembly constituencies in the district.

The assembly constituencies are

References

External links 

Districts of Andhra Pradesh
2022 establishments in Andhra Pradesh